Roque James Santos (born January 8, 1968) is an American former competition swimmer who represented the United States at the 1992 Summer Olympics in Barcelona, Spain.  Santos competed in the B Final of the men's 200-meter breaststroke and finished with the twelfth-best time overall.

See also
 List of University of California, Berkeley alumni

References

1968 births
Living people
American male breaststroke swimmers
California Golden Bears men's swimmers
Olympic swimmers of the United States
Sportspeople from Chico, California
Swimmers at the 1992 Summer Olympics